Loretta Fahrenholz (1981) is a contemporary artist working in experimental film and photography. She is based in Berlin, Germany.

Early life and education 
Fahrenholz graduated from the Academy of Visual Arts in Leipzig, Germany in 2007.

Career 
Fahrenholz is primarily known for the filmic works she calls "performative documentaries." These films frequently meld genres, and she frequently works in collaboration with her actors. Her work thematically unpacks the contradictions of various social milieus, everyday habits, and contemporary urban life.

She is best known for her video Ditch Plains (2013) which depicts the East New York dance group The Ringmasters Crew as they perform among the post-apolcalyptic landscape of Brooklyn following Hurricane Sandy.

Work

Major exhibitions 
Fahrenholz's first institutional solo exhibition entitled 3 Frauen was held at the Kunsthalle Zürich in 2015. The exhibition included, among others, her well-known experimental video Ditch Plains (2013), along with Implosion (2011), a film that adapted poet Kathy Acker's play of the same name. It also featured her recent experiments producing photographs using various technologies such as smartphones and 3-D point scanners. Cultural theorist Sadie Plant writes that Fahrenholz's works in this exhibition "...conjure up a sense of terrible emptiness as they explore the horrors of disembodiment, domestic and urban disconnection and the disquieting limits of role-play and make-believe."

Fahrenholz has had numerous solo exhibitions since, among other at Reena Spaulings Fine Art (2011, 2013), Galerie Buchholz (2015, 2018), Midway Contemporary Art (2015), Fridericianum, Kassel / Stedelijk Museum, Amsterdam (2016), mumok (2018), Company Gallery (2020), Neuer Berliner Kunstverein and Lumiar Cité (2021), Kölnischer Kunstverein (2022).

Public collections 
 Museum of Modern Art
 Stedelijk Museum Amsterdam
 Kadist
 Stoschek collection
 Mumok
 Museum Ludwig
 Whitney Museum of American Art

Recognition 
Fahrenholz was awarded the Villa Romana Prize in 2014.

References 

German women artists
German video artists
1981 births
Living people